Highway 917 is a provincial highway in the north-west region of the Canadian province of Saskatchewan. It runs from Highway 916 to a dead end near Doré Lake. Highway 917 is about 25 km (16 mi) long.

About 2 km north of Highway 916, Highway 917 connects with an access road to the Smoothstone Lake Recreation Site. About 5 km from Highway 916, Highway 938 branches off.

See also 
Roads in Saskatchewan
Transportation in Saskatchewan

References 

917